OJSC Turkmenistan Airlines (commonly known as Türkmenhowaýollary) is the flag carrier and only airline of Turkmenistan, headquartered in Ashgabat. It operates domestic and international passenger and cargo services mainly from its hub at Ashgabat International Airport.

History 
The state-owned service Turkmenistan Airlines was founded 4 May 1992. In 1992, Turkmenistan Airlines became the first airline in the former Soviet Union to purchase a Boeing 737-300. In April 1993, Turkmenistan became a full member of the International Civil Aviation Organization (ICAO). The first flight on a cargo aircraft IL-76 was completed on 19 April 1993 from Ashgabat to Brest, Belarus.

From 2001, the airline phased out its Soviet-era fleet for a more modern fleet of Boeing 717s, which were extensively used for service on domestic routes until their retirement. Seven of the 717 series were purchased; the first was presented at the MAKS air show in 2001. On 29 April 2009 a Boeing 737-700 was demonstrated in Ashgabat and on 2 September Boeing announced that Turkmenistan Airlines had confirmed an order for three more such aircraft worth $192 million. Autumn airline supplemented by three Boeing airliners. In May 2009, the airline opened the Lachyn Hotel in Ashgabat for transit passengers. Designed for 200 guests, it is located on Bitarap Türkmenistan şaýoly, which connects the city center to the Ashgabat Airport. On 1 July 2011, the airline began to operate an Electronic ticket system on all flights. Booking flights can be carried out in the standard way, but information about air travel began to be given out in the form of a passenger itinerary receipt.

On 8 May 2013, a Boeing 737-800 was delivered. On 3 June 2013 a fourth Boeing 737-800 arrived, and on 18 December 2013 a fifth Boeing 737-800 arrived.

In 2012, the airline began printing the full-colour magazine Lachyn ("Falcon"). This was the first in-flight product in Turkmenistan. The magazine is also distributed in the halls for official delegations and VIP-zones of airports in Turkmenistan. In the same year, the airline carried 57,500 passengers to 15 international destinations and approx. 90,000 passengers on domestic routes per month (c. 1.77 million passengers per year).

In January 2013 regular cargo flights to Brno commenced. In March 2013 a new ticket sales centre was opened at 61 Atatürk Street. This building houses 30 sales offices; 17 for domestic flights and 13 for international routes. In August 2013 a regular passenger flight to Lviv was started. In October of the same year, flights to Donetsk and Riga commenced  followed in December by the first scheduled service to Western Europe - Paris. In March 2014, Turkmenistan Airlines announced that it was to commence long-haul flights using its newly acquired Boeing 777-200LRs. The aircraft are currently utilized on flights to Bangkok, Beijing, Birmingham, Delhi and Istanbul.

Re-organization 
In 2017, the air transport enterprise of the State National Service Türkmenhowaýollary was transformed into a joint-stock company Turkmenistan Airlines.

On 4 February 2019, the European Aviation Safety Agency (EASA) suspended Turkmenistan Airlines' permission to fly in the EU. This forced the airline to terminate its routes to the United Kingdom, France and Germany. In December, Turkmenistan Airlines resumed regular passenger traffic to European Union countries after a 10-month break.

In connection with the COVID-19 pandemic and for the safety of passengers, Turkmenistan Airlines suspended all international regular passenger flights in March 2020. In order to prevent the import and spread of coronavirus infection, all planes arriving in Turkmenistan from abroad are redirected to the Turkmenabat International Airport or Turkmenbashi International Airport.

Since March 2021, Turkmenistan Airlines switched to the new Piece Concept baggage system.

In May 2022, Turkmenistan Airlines  announced the resumption of flights to Dubai, the popular UAE tourist destination as the travel industry starts recovering from the COVID-19 impact. In 2022, regular passenger flights to Istanbul, Kazan, Moscow, Dubai, Frankfurt and Abu Dhabi were resumed. Aircraft began to return to Ashgabat (during the pandemic, they were redirected to Turkmenabat and Turkmenbashi).

Destinations 

, Turkmenistan Airlines operates flights to only 5 domestic destinations from its hub at Ashgabat International Airport and  6 international destinations in 4 countries. The airline also operates dedicated cargo flights.

Codeshare agreements
Turkmenistan Airlines has code share agreements with the following airlines:
 Belavia
 S7 Airlines

Fleet

Current fleet

, the Turkmenistan Airlines commercial passenger fleet is all-Boeing. The full fleet (commercial passenger, VIP, cargo) consists of the following aircraft:

Historical fleet
Turkmenistan Airlines historically has operated the following aircraft:

 Antonov An-24
 Boeing 717-200
 Boeing 737-300
 Boeing 767-300ER
 Tupolev Tu-154
 Yakovlev Yak-40
 Yakovlev Yak-42

Corporate affairs

Headquarters
The headquarters of Turkmenistan Airlines  are in Hero of Turkmenistan Atamyrat Nyýazow Avenue, 326  in Ashgabat.

References

External links

 Official website
 Flight Information Region In Turkmenistan

Airlines of Turkmenistan
Airlines established in 1992
Airlines formerly banned in the European Union
Former Aeroflot divisions
1992 establishments in Turkmenistan
Companies based in Ashgabat